Lady Catherine Hannah Charlotte Elliott Jackson (1824–1891), was the daughter of Thomas Elliot of Wakefield, and was also the second wife of Knight Diplomat Sir George Jackson (1785–1861), whom she married in 1856, and a prolific author in her own right, especially in the area of European history and of the court of France in the 16th century.

After the death of her husband in 1861, she turned to literature, starting by editing the diaries and letters of her husband's early life. He was a distinguished diplomat, and is best known for accompanying Sir Charles Stuart to Germany and entering Paris with him in 1815, and for his efforts in connection with the abolition of the slave trade.

On 19 June 1874 she was granted a pension in recognition of her husband's services.

She then studied a variety of French memoirs, and compiled from them several books on French society. A few of the better known including "Old Paris: its Court and Literary Salons", appeared in two volumes in 1878, and "The Court of France in the Sixteenth Century", also in two volumes.

Lady Jackson also wrote about art, especially Western painting, in her histories of the French royal court. In her book "The Court of France in the Sixteenth Century", she observed:

"At about this time [speaking of the painter Raphael] only, movable pictures, to be hung on walls as ornaments, began to be in frequent demand. It is considered doubtful whether before the sixteenth century any such existed. For what would now be termed the easel pictures of the older masters have been detached from some articles of civil or ecclesiastical furniture."

Notes

Bibliography
 Old Paris: Its Court and Literary Salons (2. vol, 1878)
 The Old Régime: Court, salons, and theatres
 The French Court and Society. Reign of Louis XVI, and First Empire
 The Court of the Tuileries from the Restoration to the Flight of Louis Philippe
 The Court of France in the Sixteenth Century: 1514–1559
 The Last of the Valois, and Accession of Henry of Navarre: 1559–1589
 The First of the Bourbons: 1595–1610
 The Diaries and Letters of Sir George Jackson (ed. by Jackson, Richard Bentley and Son, 2. vol, 1872)
 The Bath Archives (ed by Jackson, 2. vol, 1873) 
 Fair Lusitania (Richard Bentley and Son, 1874)

External links
Note on Lady Jackson at the National Archives (UK)

1824 births
1891 deaths
19th-century English historians
Historians of France
British women historians